Margnat was a French professional cycling team that existed from 1958 to 1965. Its main sponsor was French winemaker Margnat. Federico Bahamontes won three successive Tour de France mountains classifications with the team (1962, 1963 and 1964).

References

External links

Cycling teams based in France
Defunct cycling teams based in France
1958 establishments in France
1965 disestablishments in France
Cycling teams established in 1958
Cycling teams disestablished in 1965